Wola Miastkowska  is a village in the administrative district of Gmina Miastków Kościelny, within Garwolin County, Masovian Voivodeship, in east-central Poland.

References

Wola Miastkowska